Nikanorovka is a rural locality (a selo) and the administrative center of Nikanorovskaya Territorial Administration, Gubkinsky District, Belgorod Oblast, Russia. The population was 1,012 as of 2010. There are 7 streets.

Geography 
Nikanorovka is located 44 km southwest of Gubkin (the district's administrative centre) by road. Kretov-Pervy is the nearest rural locality.

References 

Rural localities in Gubkinsky District